The use of firearms by police forces varies widely across the world, in part due to differences in gun use policy, civilian firearm laws, and recording of police activity. Police forces may require that officers use warning shots before aiming on-target, officers may need to make verbal warnings before using their firearms, and officers may be prohibited from carrying weapons while performing tasks such as highway patrol where gun use is not expected.

Unarmed police forces

In nineteen countries or territories, the police do not carry firearms unless the situation is expected to merit it: Bhutan, Botswana, Cook Islands, Fiji,  Iceland, Ireland, Kiribati, Malawi, Marshall Islands, Nauru, New Zealand, Niue, Norway, Samoa, Solomon Islands, Tonga, Tuvalu, South Korea, the United Kingdom (except for Northern Ireland), the U.S. Virgin Islands and Vanuatu. These countries exhibit gun-homicide rates markedly lower on average than countries with armed police forces. Their police forces commonly adopt a philosophy of policing by consent.

A survey conducted in Great Britain in 2004 found that 47% of citizens supported arming all police while 48% were opposed to the idea.

Australia

Police in Australia carry firearms which are personally issued to them. The Australian police forces are monitored by the Australian Institute of Criminology, which has recorded police shooting deaths since 1989. All fatal police shootings are subject to a mandatory coronial inquest. A 2013 review by the Australian Institute of Criminology found that 42% of victims of fatal police shootings had a mental illness. A more recent history of deaths by police shootings is tabulated below.

1.Data provided by the Australian Institute of Criminology

Austria

Police in Austria usually carry firearms, including Glock pistols. They are monitored by the Austrian Interior Ministry. Since 2006 the records of police firearm use have been expanded to show whether or not a round was targeted at people.

1.10 injuries, severity not specified.
Data reported on by Heute

Czech Republic

All uniformed police officers belonging to the Police of the Czech Republic (PČR) and all Municipal police departments usually carry firearms. Most officers are equipped with CZ 75D Compact pistols. The use of firearms by police officers belonging to the PČR is regulated by the Act no. 273/2008 Sb. (Act on the Police of the Czech Republic), which defines the ways an officer can use his service weapon and states that a police officer of the PČR is not a subject to the Act no. 119/2002 Sb. (Act on Firearms and ammunition) and as such doesn't have to possess a weapons licence. 

The use by officers belonging to a municipal police department is regulated by the Act no. 119/2002 Sb. therefore they need to possess the appropriate weapons licence. The use is further regulated by the Act no. 553/1991 Sb. (Act on the Municipal Police), which gives officers more rights regarding the use of a firearm, such as the right to open carry. 

The regulation for the Municipal Police is generally more strict than the regulation for PČR and doesn't give municipal police officers the same rights as PČR officers.

Table below only includes the statistics for PČR officers and doesn't include municipal police departments.

1.Data until 31st of August
2.Data until 13th of November
Data reported on by the Police of the Czech Republic

Denmark

Since 1965, all Danish police officers have carried firearms when performing their duties. Danish police used Walther PPK 7.65 mm as the standard pistol until 2000, and then the Heckler & Koch USP 9 mm was introduced. In 2008 police began to carry pepper spray in addition to their firearm. Further, all officers are trained in the use of Heckler & Koch MP5, which is issued on special assignments or severe incidents.

Additionally, every police district have specially trained "Reaktionspatruljer" deployed round the clock, carrying the 5.56 × 45 mm NATO GV M/10.

The appropriate use of firearms is described in the Act on Police Activities regulations, section 16 and 17 is translated into English in.

In Denmark the police use of weapons is recorded by the police department. The police department classifies tear gas as the use of a firearm. In 2006 the death of four people by police shootings prompted an investigation into the use of firearms by the Danish police force from 1996 to 2006. The investigation found no significant trends of increased firearms use by the police.

1.Includes warning shots and tear gas fired.
2.Includes shots aimed at vehicle tyres.

More recent figures have been published separately in a different format.

Finland

Police in Finland have access to weapons including a Glock 17, Heckler & Koch MP5, Taser and pepper spray. The use of firearms is recorded by the Police College and the Finnish ministry of the Interior.

Data reported on by YLE uutiset

France
In France the police carry firearms, however, there is no official record of how frequently firearms are used. An independent group A Toutes Les Victimes has tracked the number of deaths and injuries by police which have been published in the media since 2005. In 2021 the National Assembly passed Article 25, allowing French police officers to carry service firearms while off-duty, though their use remains strictly limited to defense of self and others.  

1Unofficial data from the A Toutes Les Victimes census

Germany

German police forces usually carry firearms. Police firearm statistics dating back to 1996 are available, a summary of recent years is tabulated below.

Iceland
Icelandic police do not regularly carry firearms. In 2013 the first fatal police shooting took place where one man was killed. As of October 2019 this remains the only fatal police shooting since Iceland became an independent republic in 1944.

Ireland

The strength of the Garda Síochána (national police) is approximately 15,000 officers, of which approximately 4,000 are licensed to carry firearms. The rest are unarmed.

The majority of armed Gardai (officers) consist of ordinary detectives (routinely armed with handguns for personal protection) or belong to specialist regional Armed Support Units. An elite national Emergency Response Unit exists that is trained in hostage rescue tactics.

Fatal shootings by Gardai are rare and individual statistics for same are not published.

Jamaica

The Jamaica Constabulary Force's (JCF) use of lethal force has been monitored by Amnesty International. From 1983 to 2000 the Jamaican police force has been reported to kill between 121 and 355 people each year with an average of 171 deaths. A subsequent report by Amnesty USA shows that from 1998 to 2015 between 101 and 307 people were killed each year with an average of 192 deaths. In 2010, the Independent Commission of Investigations (INDECOM) was established as an independent oversight body to tackle the frequent use of lethal force by members of the Security Forces, which has made progress towards reducing the problem. A summary of recent years is tabulated below:

Japan

Uniformed officers carry firearms, typically the New Nambu M60 revolver while on duty only.  Security Police and Special Assault Team carry semi-automatic pistols and heavier submachine guns and rifles depending on the situation.

Netherlands
Law enforcement in the Netherlands usually carry firearms. In every incident where a firearm round is shot and/or hits a person there is an investigation conducted to determine if the use of a firearm was justified. The results of the investigations are made publicly available; the cases for each year are tabulated.

New Zealand

The New Zealand Police do not usually carry firearms. Under normal circumstances, police in New Zealand carry pepper spray, batons, and Tasers, though all are trained with the Glock 17 pistol and Bushmaster M4 semi-automatic rifle. These firearms are carried in all frontline police vehicles and are available for use should a situation require it. There are times when due to a credible threat, New Zealand's 12 district police commanders have the authority to arm all of their frontline officers. After the 2019 Christchurch mosque shootings all frontline police officers throughout the country were instructed by the Police Commissioner to carry guns while on duty.

In October 2019, New Zealand's Police Commissioner announced a six-month trial of Armed Response Teams (ARTs) in three Police districts. The ARTs are specialist armed police personnel who are part of the Armed Offenders Squad. The teams are a minimum of three, in specialised vehicles equipped with tactical options and operate seven days a week.

When force is used (excluding handcuffs) a tactical operations report is filed. Use of tactical options is published by the police force.

A summary of tactical options used in 2010–2014 was published in 2015. In 33,198 events over the four-year period, firearms were drawn 1,422 times, resulting in 5 injuries. Tactical operations resulting in fatalities are not recorded in the database.

In 2020 seven firearm discharges occurred in five incidents, three resulted in fatal injuries, one in non-fatal injuries, and one missed the subject.

Since 1916, New Zealand Police have used lethal force 40 times.

Norway
The Norwegian Police Service (NPS) only carry firearms in response to specific situations, keeping their Heckler & Koch MP5s and Heckler & Koch P30s locked in the patrol cars. The use of firearms is recorded by the police station which publishes detailed statistics on the annual use of firearms. The information presented in the 2014 report is detailed in the table below.

Russia

Generally, Russian police forces carry firearms and are armed with pistols at a minimum. There is no consistent recording of firearms use across the country.

Use of firearms can only be lawful where it is necessary to confront an imminent threat of death or serious injury or a grave and proximate threat to life. Since 2011 the Investigative Committee is responsible for the investigation of alleged unlawful use of police force.

South Africa
The South African Police Service is monitored by the Independent Police Investigative Directorate (IPID) which releases an annual report on the performance indicators of police activity. The IPID publishes deaths as a results of police action and deaths in police custody. Use of firearms forms the majority of the killings by police; shootings by police are all classified under deaths as a result of police action.

 Includes all categories of deaths as a result of police action with labels "Shot with service firearm", "Shot with police firearm" and "Negligent handling of a firearm leading to death". Excludes suicides.

Sweden
Officers of the Swedish Police Authority usually carry firearms when on duty. The standard weapon issued to officers is the SIG Sauer P226. The police authority report that normally police will threaten to use their weapon but do not discharge it; this happens about 200 times per year. In a typical year the police shoot 20 warning shots aimed at people or vehicles. An investigation reviewing the use of weapons by police details the firearm use from 2003 to 2014.

Only the most serious use of violence is counted, if an incident involves both warning shots and shots for effect it is only counted in the shots for effect section.

United Kingdom

Police forces in the United Kingdom are managed by different bodies and thus have different standards for firearms usage. Police in Northern Ireland regularly carry firearms whereas the police in Great Britain do not.

England and Wales

The police force in England and Wales do not routinely carry firearms. A 2006 poll of 47,328 members of the Police Federation of England and Wales found that 82% do not want officers to be routinely armed while on duty. The UK Home Office reports annual statistics on the use of firearms by police forces. The use of firearms is recorded by the police department which publishes detailed statistics on the annual use of firearms dating back to 2003. One report published figures for 2003–2013; later years are published individually. While the Home Office monitors the use of police equipment, the Independent Police Complaints Commission monitored the fatalities of people due to police contact up to 2016.

Data provided by the UK Home Office.
Data provided by the Independent Police Complaints Commission

In 2017 the Independent Police Complaints Commission was replaced with the Independent Office for Police Conduct (IOPC). The IOPC publishes the use of firearms in a different format. Reported figures on fatal shootings by police are tabled below.

Data provided by the UK Home Office.
Data provided by the Independent Office for Police Conduct

Northern Ireland
The Police Service of Northern Ireland publish an annual report on the police use of force which lists the frequency that firearms were drawn and fired. However, this report does not list the injuries or deaths resulting from firearms use.

Data published by the Police Service of Northern Ireland.

Scotland
The Police Investigation & Review Commissioner publishes an annual report on assessments of complaints and investigations carried out.

Conventional firearms only.
Deaths and injuries arising from firearms and other police contact.
Data published by the Police Investigation & Review Commissioner.

United States

Generally, all law enforcement officers in the United States carry firearms and are armed with pistols at a minimum. There is no consistent recording of firearms use across all states; some bodies, such as the New York Police Department (NYPD), report on firearms discharge. In 2015 NYPD reported a record low of eight deaths as well as fifteen injuries caused by police firearms discharge.

The Federal Bureau of Investigation publish the number of "justified" homicides by law enforcement.

In response to the lack of published data, the organization Campaign Zero launched Mapping Police Violence to collect comprehensive data on people killed by police in the United States. Similarly, the British newspaper The Guardian launched "The Counted" – a program to record the number of fatal police shootings throughout the United States. The Guardian reports that 1,146 people were killed in 2015 and 1,093 people in 2016.

Justifiable homicides recorded by the FBI
Mapping Police Violence. Unofficial figures based on media reports
The Counted. Unofficial figures based on media reports
Fatal Force. Unofficial figures based on media reports

See also
List of countries with annual rates and counts for killings by law enforcement officers

References

Law enforcement use of force
Gun politics by country